Terdobbiate is a comune (municipality) in the Province of Novara in the Italian region Piedmont, located about  northeast of Turin and about  southeast of Novara.

Terdobbiate borders the following municipalities: Cassolnovo, Garbagna Novarese, Nibbiola, Sozzago, Tornaco, and Vespolate.

References

Cities and towns in Piedmont